The 1947 New South Wales Rugby Football League premiership was the fortieth season of Sydney’s top-level rugby league competition, Australia’s first. For the first time, the number of clubs in the league reached double digits due to the admission of Manly-Warringah and Parramatta to the first grade competition. The season culminated in a grand final between the Balmain and Canterbury-Bankstown clubs.

Season summary
Midway through the season the Balmain club looked out of touch winning only six of their first twelve games. Five consecutive wins to end the regular season left them in position to make a finals assault. Balmain’s Bob Lulham set a new record for the highest number of tries by a player in a debut season with a tally of 28 tries in eighteen matches. This remains that club’s record for tries in a season.

Teams
The addition of two teams, Manly-Warringah and Parramatta, saw ten teams from across the city contest during the 1947 premiership, the first expansion of the League since Canterbury-Bankstown’s introduction in 1935. Manly had been competing for a number of years in the NSWRFL's President's Cup (3rd grade) competition and had been assured by the league of first grade status should they win the Presidents Cup, which they finally did in 1946. After Cumberland’s demise from the league, pressure began to build in the area for another team in the NSWRFL in the 1930s, though this died down during World War II and a Parramatta district club was not proposed again until 1946 when the club was successfully admitted into the Premiership.
 Balmain, formed on January 23, 1908, at Balmain Town Hall
 Canterbury-Bankstown, formed on September 25, 1934
 Eastern Suburbs, formed on January 24, 1908, at Paddington Town Hall
 Manly-Warringah admitted in 1947
 Newtown, formed on January 14, 1908
 North Sydney, formed on February 7, 1908
 Parramatta, formed in November 1946
 South Sydney, formed on January 17, 1908, at Redfern Town Hall
 St. George, formed on November 8, 1920, at Kogarah School of Arts
 Western Suburbs, formed on February 4, 1908

Ladder

Finals

Grand final

The Tigers had strung together seven consecutive wins including a preliminary final victory over minor premiers Canterbury in their attempt at a second straight premiership. Canterbury exercised their “right of challenge” after losing the final and called for a Grand Final decider.

The formidable Canterbury front row of Eddie Burns, Roy Kirkaldy and Henry Porter were combining in their tenth season for over one hundred and fifty appearances as a scrum front trio. They led a punishing Berries defence and gave their side a better-than-even chance of possession in the scrum contests.

Balmain’s star international centre and Kangaroo captain Joe Jorgenson had played and coached on a country contract in Junee in 1947 but returned to the Tigers reserve-grade in time for the semifinals. The Grand Final marked his sole first-grade appearance of the season. Balmain’s Test five-eighth Pat Devery was the nominated match kicker but after several misses he passed over to Jorgenson who kicked three penalties to keep Balmain in the game and trailing 9–6 with ten minutes to go.

Then Jorgenson crashed over for a try under the posts and after receiving medical attention he converted his own goal to give the Tigers an 11–9 lead. A final 45-yard penalty goal then sealed the match for the Tigers at 13–9 with Jorgenson scoring all of Balmain’s points and being chaired victorious from the field.

Balmain  13 (Tries: Jorgenson. Goals: Jorgenson 5 )

defeated

Canterbury-Bankstown 9 (Tries: Hasson. Goals: Johnson 2, Hasson)

Player statistics
The following statistics are as of the conclusion of Round 18.

Top 5 point scorers

Top 5 try scorers

Top 5 goal scorers

References

External links
 Rugby League Tables - Notes AFL Tables
 Rugby League Tables - Season 1947 AFL Tables
 Premiership History and Statistics RL1908
 Finals lineups and results Hunterlink site
 Balmain Official History Tigers History Site
 Whiticker, Alan(2004) Captaining the Kangaroos, New Holland, Sydney
 Results:1941-1950 at rabbitohs.com.au
 1947 Labor Daily Cup at rleague.com
 1947 NSWRFL season at rugbyleagueproject.org

New South Wales Rugby League premiership
Nswrfl season